Plasmin is an important enzyme present in blood that degrades many blood plasma proteins, including fibrin clots. The degradation of fibrin is termed fibrinolysis.  In humans, the plasmin protein (in the zymogen form of plasminogen) is encoded by the PLG gene.

Function 

Plasmin is a serine protease that acts to dissolve fibrin blood clots. Apart from fibrinolysis, plasmin proteolyses proteins in various other systems: It activates collagenases, some mediators of the complement system, and weakens the wall of the Graafian follicle, leading to ovulation. Plasmin is also integrally involved in inflammation.  It cleaves fibrin, fibronectin, thrombospondin, laminin, and von Willebrand factor. Plasmin, like trypsin, belongs to the family of serine proteases.

Plasmin is released as a zymogen called plasminogen (PLG) from the liver into the systemic circulation.  Two major glycoforms of plasminogen are present in humans - type I plasminogen contains two glycosylation moieties (N-linked to N289 and O-linked to T346), whereas type II plasminogen contains only a single O-linked sugar (O-linked to T346).  Type II plasminogen is preferentially recruited to the cell surface over the type I glycoform.  Conversely, type I plasminogen appears more readily recruited to blood clots.

In circulation, plasminogen adopts a closed, activation-resistant conformation.  Upon binding to clots, or to the cell surface, plasminogen adopts an open form that can be converted into active plasmin by a variety of enzymes, including tissue plasminogen activator (tPA), urokinase plasminogen activator (uPA), kallikrein, and factor XII (Hageman factor). Fibrin is a cofactor for plasminogen activation by tissue plasminogen activator. Urokinase plasminogen activator receptor (uPAR) is a cofactor for plasminogen activation by urokinase plasminogen activator.  The conversion of plasminogen to plasmin involves the cleavage of the peptide bond between Arg-561 and Val-562.

Plasmin cleavage produces angiostatin.

Mechanism of plasminogen activation 

Full length  plasminogen comprises seven domains.  In addition to a  C-terminal chymotrypsin-like serine protease domain, plasminogen contains an N-terminal Pan Apple domain (PAp) together with five Kringle domains (KR1-5). The Pan-Apple domain contains important determinants for maintaining plasminogen in the closed form, and the kringle domains are responsible for binding to lysine residues present in receptors and substrates.

The X-ray crystal structure of closed plasminogen reveals that the PAp and SP domains maintain the closed conformation through interactions made throughout the kringle array . Chloride ions further bridge the PAp / KR4 and SP / KR2 interfaces, explaining the physiological role of serum chloride in stabilizing the closed conformer. The structural studies also reveal that differences in glycosylation alter the position of KR3.  These data help explain the functional differences between the type I and type II  plasminogen glycoforms.

In closed plasminogen, access to the activation bond (R561/V562) targeted for cleavage by tPA and uPA is blocked through the position of the KR3/KR4 linker sequence and the O-linked sugar on T346. The position of KR3 may also hinder access to the activation loop. The Inter-domain interactions also block all kringle ligand-binding sites apart from that of KR-1, suggesting that the latter domain governs pro-enzyme recruitment to targets. Analysis of an intermediate plasminogen structure suggests that plasminogen conformational change to the open form is initiated through KR-5 transiently peeling away from the PAp domain. These movements expose the KR5 lysine-binding site to potential binding partners, and suggest a requirement for spatially distinct lysine residues in eliciting plasminogen recruitment and conformational change respectively.

Mechanism of plasmin inactivation 

Plasmin is inactivated by proteins such as α2-macroglobulin and α2-antiplasmin. The mechanism of plasmin inactivation involves the cleavage of an α2-macroglobulin at the bait region (a segment of the aM that is particularly susceptible to proteolytic cleavage) by plasmin. This initiates a conformational change such that the α2-macroglobulin collapses about the plasmin. In the resulting α2-macroglobulin-plasmin complex, the active site of plasmin is sterically shielded, thus substantially decreasing the plasmin's access to protein substrates. Two additional events occur as a consequence of bait region cleavage, namely (i) a h-cysteinyl-g-glutamyl thiol ester of the α2-macroglobulin becomes highly reactive and (ii) a major conformational change exposes a conserved COOH-terminal receptor binding domain. The exposure of this receptor binding domain allows the α2-macroglobulin protease complex to bind to clearance receptors and be removed from circulation.

Pathology 

Plasmin deficiency may lead to thrombosis, as the clots are not adequately degraded. Plasminogen deficiency in mice leads to defective liver repair, defective wound healing, reproductive abnormalities.

In humans, a rare disorder called plasminogen deficiency type I is caused by mutations of the PLG gene and is often manifested by ligneous conjunctivitis.

Interactions 

Plasmin has been shown to interact with Thrombospondin 1, Alpha 2-antiplasmin and IGFBP3. Moreover, plasmin induces the generation of bradykinin in mice and humans through high-molecular-weight kininogen cleavage.

References

Further reading

External links 
The MEROPS online database for peptidases and their inhibitors: S01.233

Acute-phase proteins
Fibrinolytic system
EC 3.4.21
Extracellular matrix remodeling enzymes